Abdel-Kader Abbes (born 14 March 1914, date of death unknown) was an Algerian racing cyclist. He rode in the 1951 Tour de France.

References

1914 births
Year of death missing
Algerian male cyclists